During the Second Sino-Japanese War the Japanese 1st Army under Lt. General Kiyoshi Katsuki drove the Chinese forces of General Cheng Qian's 1st War Area out of Northern and Eastern Honan until they were stopped by the disastrous 1938 Yellow River flood caused by the diversion of the Yellow River by the Chinese Army into the Chia-lu and Huai Rivers.

Order of battle

Further reading
Hsu Long-hsuen and Chang Ming-kai, History of The Sino-Japanese War (1937–1945) 2nd Ed., 1971. Translated by Wen Ha-hsiung, Chung Wu Publishing, pp. 230–235. Map 9-2.

Northern and Eastern Honan 1938
Northern and Eastern Henan
1938 in China
1938 in Japan
Military history of Henan